Eternal Love of Dream, also known as Three Lives Three Worlds, The Pillow Book, directed by Yang Hsuan, is a 2020 Chinese streaming television series starring Dilraba Dilmurat and Vengo Gao It is based on the novel Three Lives Three Worlds, The Pillow Book by Tangqi Gongzi, and is the sequel to the 2017 drama Eternal Love. It tells the entangled love story of Donghua and Bei Fengjiu lasting for 3 lives. Being rescued by Donghua when she was little, Bei Fengjiu is prompted to return this favor. Her admiration and gratitude gradually turns into love. The series started airing on Tencent Video on January 22, 2020, and concluded its run of 56 episodes on March 5, 2020.

Synopsis 
When she was little, nine-tailed red fox Bai Fengjiu got lost in Monster Realm, where she was attacked by a savage beast and rescued by Donghua, the former emperor of the Heaven Clan. This makes her determined to repay this life debt. She enters Taichen Palace, where Donghua lives, as a maid to find an opportunity to repay him. To save him from the Ten-Lotus ward, she is turned into an ordinary one-tailed fox, which Donghua, unaware that the fox is one of his maids, then brings back to his palace and raises as a pet. Hearing that Donghua is about to marry Jiheng – princess of the Demon Clan, Fengjiu leaves Taichen Palace. Donghua then searches for her but fails to find her.

Fengjiu repays her life debt to Donghua by helping him in his mortal trial.

Donghua and Fengjiu encounter each other several times both in Fengjiu's hometown Qingqiu and in heaven. While Donghua quickly takes interest in her, she keeps avoiding him. Donghua brings a handkerchief, knowing that it is Fengjiu in disguise, to a battle against Yan Chiwu, where a cyclone appears and sweeps both Chiwu and Fengjiu into Fanyin Valley. 6 months later, Fengjiu registers for a competition, where the prize is a pimpon fruit (a magical fruit capable of reviving mortal bodies), to revive Ye Qingti, whom Fengjiu feel indebted to as he died to save her. Donghua, who comes here as a teacher, trains Fengjiu to prepare for the competition. Upon winning, Fengjiu is soon disappointed because the prize has been switched to peaches and heartbroken to hear from Jiheng that Donghua gladly gave her the fruit at her insistence. Determined to get it at all cost, Fengjiu comes to the snake's maze and ultimately enters Aranya's dream. She is then saved again by Donghua, and they both realize their feelings for each other.

On their wedding day, Donghua does not show up because Jiheng emotionally blackmails him and compels him to stay single forever. He furiously transfers the poison from her body to his own and prohibits her from ever leaving the Monster realm. A brokenhearted Fengjiu leaves and starts her new life in the mortal realm with her son Bai Gungun. At their last meeting before Donghua's final battle with Miaoluo, he gives her a ring made from half of his heart, which she refuses. When she finds out that Donghua is about to die in a battle, she decides to join it to help him; and they finally succeed. While treating Fengjiu, Donghua gets to meet his son Gungun.

Cast

Main

 Dilraba Dilmurat as Bai Fengjiu
 The youngest female monarch of Qing Qiu, and the only known nine-tailed red fox in the world. Bai Yi's daughter and Bai Qian's niece.
 Vengo Gao as Dong Hua Dijun
 The first heavenly emperor of the Heaven Clan; the man who united the world.

Supporting

Qing Qiu

 Zhang Gong as Bai Zhi
 King of the Fox tribe.
 Ma Rui as Fox Queen
 Wife of Bai Zhi. Bai Qian, Bai Zhen, and Bai Yi's mother.
 Baron Chen as Zhe Yan
 The first phoenix deity in the world. A well-known peach winemaker and a renowned doctor who resides in the peach blossoms forest.
 Leng Haiming as Bai Yi
 Second son of the Fox King. Feng Jiu's father.
 Zhang Yufei as Feng Jiu's mother
 Huang Junjie as Bai Zhen
 Fourth son of the Fox King.
 Yang Mi as Bai Qian
 Youngest daughter of the Fox King. Former female monarch of the Qing Qiu kingdom and current Crown Princess of the Heaven Clan. A Li's mother.
 Zhang Mingcan as A Li
 Bai Qian and Ye Hua's son.
 Kou Jinghao as Bai Gungun
  Feng Jiu and Dong Hua's son.
 Zhao Ziqi as Mi Gu
 A tree spirit. Housekeeper of Qing Qiu.
 Wang Yiming as Xiao Jingwei
 Bai Zhen's mount, Feng Jiu's classmate.

Nine Heavens

 Jiang Kai as Heavenly Emperor
 Current ruler of the Nine Heavens.
 Li Dongheng as Lian Song
 Third prince of the Nine Heavens.
 Dylan Kuo as Su Moye
 The second prince of the West Sea.
 Wang Xiao as Si Ming
 A deity in charge of mankind's fate.
 Yuan Yuxuan as Cheng Yu
 An immortal who is brought from the mortal realm to the Nine Heavens by the Heaven Lord.
 Wang Yifei as Zhi He
 A water deity under Lian Song. Dong Hua's adopted sister (her parents helped raise Dong Hua).
 Hu Yunhao as Xie Guchou
 Lord of the Underworld in charge of human reincarnation.
 Zhang Yunlong as Cang Yi
 Deity of Mount Zhi Yue.
 Chong Ming as Meng Hao
 An aquatic dragon deity who once served under Dong Hua. Ji Heng's father.
 Wang Minghui as Yun Zhuang
 He helped cast Dong Hua's shadow into the Fan Yin valley and created one of the souls to be Shen Ye.
 Fan Zhixin as Chong Lin
 Housekeeper of Tai Chen Palace.
 Chen Siche as Yu Ru
 Zhi He's personal servant.
 Wang Mengjiao as Zhao Lu
 Maid of Taichen Palace. Feng Jiu's friend.

Fan Yin Valley / Aranya’s Dream

 Li Jinrong as Xiangli Que
 Former King of Biyi Bird tribe. Aranya and Chang Di's birth father. He rebelled against his brother and took over the throne because he was in love with Qing Hua, who at the time was his sister-in-law.
 Che Yongli as Qing Hua
 Former Queen of the Biyi Bird tribe. Aranya's mother.
 Li Bowen as Xiangli He
 Crown prince of the Biyi Bird tribe.
 Fu Miao Sun Xuening as Xiangli Ju Nuo
 First princess and current Queen of the Biyi Bird tribe. Xiangli Meng's mother. Shen Ye's fiancée.
 Ma Zhehan as Xiangli Chang Di
 Third princess of the Biyi Bird tribe.
 Yi Daqian as Xiangli Meng
 Second prince of the Biyi Bird tribe. Son of Xiangli Ju Nuo.
 Dilraba Dilmurat as Xiangli Aranya
 Second princess of the Biyi Bird tribe.
 Vengo Gao as Shen Ye
 Archmage of the Biyi Bird tribe, Aranya's cousin.
 Zhu Yongteng as Xi Ze
 Former Archmage of the Biyi Bird tribe. Aranya's husband (in name), and Shen Ye's teacher.
 Tian Xuanning as Wen Tian
 A female scholar at the Royal Academy.
 Zhuang Dafei as Jie Lu
 Xiangli Meng's cousin.
 Ye Yunfei as Cha Cha
 Aranya's personal servant.

Demon Clan

 Zhang Wen as Miao Luo
 Ruler of the Demon Clan. She was created from the dark energy seeping out of the Hui Ming Realm.
 Jin Zehao as Xu Yang
 Ruler of the Red Demon Clan. Ji Heng's adopted brother. He is sworn brothers with Yan Chi Wu.
 Liu Yuxin as Ji Heng
 Princess of the Red Demon Clan, Dong Hua's disciple.
 Liu Ruilin as Yan Chiwu
 Ruler of the Green Demon Clan, younger twin brother of Zi Lan.
 Dai Xiangyu as Nie Chuyin
 One of the Seven Lord of the Demon Clan.
 Wang Ruoshan as Min Su
 Ji Heng's personal servant and bodyguard.
 Wang Kui as Xuan Yue
 Yan Chiwu's subordinate.

Mortal realm

 Vengo Gao as Song Xuanren
 Emperor of Cheng Yu kingdom. Dong Hua's mortal identity.
 Dilraba Dilmurat as Madam/Lady Jiu
 Consort of Song Xuanren Feng Jiu's mortal identity.
 Xu Shaoying as Ye Qingti
 A general. Oldest son of Ye Zhen. Marquis with a military background.
 Liu Yuxin as Chu Wan
 Song Xuanren's consort. Adopted Princess of Chong'an Kingdom. Ji Heng's mortal identity after she fell off a cliff and lost her memory.
 Wang Ruoshan as Ling Xiang
 Chu Wan's personal servant.
 Hu Kun as Song Xueying
 Yang Mingna as Consort Xian

Production
On January 24, 2018, it was announced Vengo Gao and Dilraba Dilmurat would be reprising their roles as Dong Hua and Bai Fengjiu from Eternal Love, respectively. Eternal Love of Dream is Vengo Gao and Dilraba Dilmurat's seventh collaboration, after Swords of Legends, V Love, Legend of Ban Shu, The Ladder of Love, Eternal Love, and Mr. Pride vs Miss Prejudice.

The series began filming on June 10, 2018 at Hengdian World Studios, and wrapped 162 days later on November 19, 2018.

Reception

Eternal Love of Dream surpassed more than 190 million views on its first day of release, and over 1 billion views in just one week on Chinese Tencent Video platforms. As of April 2021, the series has exceeded 8 billion views on the online platform. The series also gained a firm footing internationally, scoring a first in the online view rankings for Thailand, and exceeding a million clicks for its first few episodes in Vietnam. The series has a 6.7 and 7.9 rating on Douban and China Tencent Video, respectively.

Eternal Love of Dream won "Best Web Series of the Year" at the 2020 Tencent Video All Star Awards, while Vengo Gao won "Quality Series Actor of the Year" and Dilraba Dilmurat won "Most Popular Series Actor of the Year". For his role as Dong Hua, Vengo Gao also won "Best Actor in a Period Drama" at the 29th Huading Awards.

Soundtrack

References 

Television series by Tencent Penguin Pictures
Television series by Jay Walk Studio
Chinese romantic fantasy television series
Xianxia television series
2020 web series debuts
Tencent original programming
2020 Chinese television series debuts
2020 Chinese television series endings